Spaceline were a contemporary English band formed by the River Kennet, Berkshire, UK in 2002 by multi-instrumentalist Steve Head, harmonicist/guitarist Barry Newman and drummer Ben Wilcox. The group, then based in London, UK, were later joined by Cam Reynolds on Hammond organ, viola player Abi Fry (of British Sea Power and Bat for Lashes, among others) and steel/lead guitarist Nick Benfield.

2005 saw the band release tracks on the acclaimed Live at the Electroacoustic Club - Volume 1 on Running Jump Records as well as two volumes of $talker Records' At The Forum compilation series. The band also released the limited edition Country Love EP in 2003.

Head has played lead guitar with Ghosts, recent signees to Atlantic Records and Trevor Horn's publishing label Perfect Songs, toured in late-2006 with Beggars Banquet Records band The Early Years and also plays Hammond, piano, bass and guitar in the improvisation collective The Flowers of Hell. Newman's own project, The Slow, can be found playing regular shows around London and beyond. Wilcox went on to play rhythm/lead and slide guitar for Reading-based band The Gooches.

Spaceline split up in early 2007, due to commitments with their various other projects. New material, featuring various members of the band, along with new members, and under a new guise, was expected to be released later in the year.

External links
Official website
Spaceline at MySpace
Running Jump Records
$talker Records

Musical groups from Berkshire